August Natterer (3 August 1868 – 7 October 1933), also known as Neter, was a German outsider artist with schizophrenia.

Biography 
August Natterer, given the pseudonym Neter by his psychiatrist to protect him and his family from the intense social stigma associated with mental illness at the time, was born on 3 August 1868 in Schornreute near Ravensburg, Germany, the son of a clerk and the youngest of nine children. Natterer studied engineering, got married, travelled widely and had a successful career as an electrician, but was suddenly stricken with delusions and anxiety attacks. On 1 April 1907, he had a pivotal hallucination of the Last Judgment during which "10,000 images flashed by in half an hour". He described it as follows:

This ordeal led to a suicide attempt and committal to the first of what would be several mental asylums occupied during the remaining twenty-six years of his life. Natterer thereafter maintained that he was the illegitimate child of Emperor Napoleon I and "Redeemer of the World". The vision had inspired an intense production of drawings, all documenting images and ideas seen in the vision.

August Natterer died of heart failure in an institution near Rottweil in 1933.

Artistic works 

Natterer was one of the "schizophrenic masters" profiled by Hans Prinzhorn in his field-defining work Artistry of the Mentally Ill. His drawings are attempts to capture the "10,000 images" of his April Fool's Day hallucination, and are always rendered in a clear, objective style, like that of a technical drawing. This may be due to his background as an electrician.

Natterer once claimed that Axle of the World, with Rabbit had predicted World War I. The rabbit represented "the uncertainty of good fortune. It began to run on the roller... the rabbit was then changed into a zebra (upper part striped) and then into a donkey (donkey's head) made of glass. A napkin was hung on the donkey; it was shaved".

Max Ernst's Oedipus Rex was influenced by Natterer's piece Miraculous Shepherd.

See also 
 Bryan Lewis Saunders

References 

Outsider artists
1868 births
1933 deaths
19th-century German painters
German male painters
20th-century German painters
20th-century German male artists
People with schizophrenia
19th-century German male artists